Anwar Siraj (born 8 December 1978, in Ethiopia) is retired Ethiopian footballer.

Siraj was also a member of the Ethiopia national football team. He finished his career in 2009.

External links

1978 births
Living people
Ethiopian footballers
Association football defenders
Ethiopia international footballers
EEPCO F.C. players
Oman Club players
Saint George S.C. players
Al-Saqr SC players
Al-Wehda SC (Aden) players
Ethiopian Premier League players
Yemeni League players
Ethiopian expatriate footballers
Expatriate footballers in Oman
Expatriate footballers in Yemen
Ethiopian expatriate sportspeople in Oman
Ethiopian expatriate sportspeople in Yemen